Nabadwip Dham railway station is a railway station on Bandel–Katwa line connecting from  to Katwa, and under the jurisdiction of Howrah railway division of Eastern Railway zone. This is the main railway station of Nabadwip town of Nadia district in the state of West Bengal. It is situated beside State Highway 8, connecting Nabadwip and Krishnanager through Gouranga Bridge. It serves Nabadwip and the surrounding areas. Almost all EMU and Passenger trains stop at Nabadwip railway station. The distance between Howrah and Nabadwip railway station is approximately 105 km. It has 16th longest railway platform in world 720 m (2,362 ft).

History 
In 1913, the Hooghly–Katwa Railway constructed a line from Bandel to Katwa. This line was electrified in 1996 with 25 kV overhead line. A project involves doubling the line of length 22 km between Nabadwip Dham-Patuli DL Railway Line was under construction. 170 Crore has been sanctioned by the Government of India. It has 16th longest railway platform in world 720 m (2,362 ft).

References 

Railway stations in Nadia district
Howrah railway division
Kolkata Suburban Railway stations